Luisa Trombetti (born 5 September 1993) is an Italian swimmer. She competed in the women's 400 metre individual medley event at the 2016 Summer Olympics. Trombetti is an athlete of the Gruppo Sportivo Fiamme Oro.

References

External links
 

1993 births
Living people
Italian female medley swimmers
Olympic swimmers of Italy
Swimmers at the 2016 Summer Olympics
Place of birth missing (living people)
Swimmers of Fiamme Oro
21st-century Italian women